Yuriy Martynov (born 5 June 1965) is a Soviet and Ukrainian former professional football player.

References

External links 
 
 

1965 births
Living people
Sportspeople from Kherson
Soviet footballers
Ukrainian footballers
FC Krystal Kherson players
FC Kakhovka players
FC Naftovyk-Ukrnafta Okhtyrka players
Warta Poznań players
Ukrainian expatriate footballers
Expatriate footballers in Poland
FC Sirius Kryvyi Rih players
Ukrainian Premier League players
FC Zirka Kropyvnytskyi players
MFC Mykolaiv players
FC Zirka-2 Kirovohrad players
Ukraine international footballers
Ukrainian football managers
FC Krystal Kherson managers
Association football forwards